The 1952 North Dakota gubernatorial election was held on November 4, 1952. Incumbent Republican Norman Brunsdale defeated Democratic nominee Ole C. Johnson with 78.74% of the vote.

Primary elections
Primary elections were held on June 24, 1952.

Democratic primary

Candidates
Ole C. Johnson

Results

Republican primary

Candidates
Norman Brunsdale, incumbent Governor
Albert Jacobson, North Dakota State Treasurer

Results

General election

Candidates
Norman Brunsdale, Republican 
Ole C. Johnson, Democratic

Results

References

1952
North Dakota
Gubernatorial